The 2011–12 season will be Politehnica Timișoara's 5th season in Liga II.

Poli finished 2nd in the table at the end of the 2010–11 Liga I season and was supposed to play in the 2011–12 UEFA Champions League, but were relegated to the Liga II because of accumulated debt.

Season 2011–2012

Pre-season

Transfers

On 4 June 2011, the capitan Dan Alexa signed with Bucharest rival Rapid București. Also with Rapid signed the defender Ovidiu Burcă.

On 16 June 2011, defenders Nikola Ignjatijević and Hélder returns to Red Star Belgrade and AS Nancy after their loan season expired. Also on 16 June, the last season Liga I top scorer Ianis Zicu signed with CSKA Sofia for €500,000 and goalkeeper Pedro Taborda terminate his contract.

On 18 June, it was confirmed that defender Jiří Krejčí was released by the club, also on 18 June Lukáš Magera and Marián Čišovský was released.

Friendlies

For the pre-season, Politehnica Timișoara will visit Hungary and Austria. It will be Poli's tenth trip to the Austria, where they will face Tatran Prešov on 30 June, Austria Salzburg on 1 July, Neftchi Baku on 3 July and SV Bischofshofen on 7 July. Also confirmed are 2 pre-season friendlies with Bihor Oradea.

Transfers

In

Out

Loaned Out

Squad list

Long-term injury list

Starting XI

Match results

Pre-season

Liga II

Romanian Cup

Player statistics

Last Update: 9 July 2011
Data includes all competitions
Substitution appearances included as full
L – Liga II
RC – Romanian Cup
Ast – Assists
N/A – Refers to a player who began the season a Politehnica Timișoara player but left the club over the course of the campaign

Top scorer
 As of the 2011–12 Liga II Season

Most appearances
 As of the 2011–12 Liga II Season

Most assists
 As of the 2011–12 Liga II Season

Liga II results by round

References

External links
Official website
Club news by GSP
 

FC Politehnica Timișoara
Politehnica Timisoara